Paragramma is a genus of ferns in the family Polypodiaceae, subfamily Microsoroideae according to the Pteridophyte Phylogeny Group classification of 2016 (PPG I). There is a single species, Paragramma longifolia. Other sources do not accept the genus, submerging it into Lepisorus, with Paragramma longifolia becoming Lepisorus longifolius (Blume) Holttum. A molecular phylogenetic study in 2019 showed that Lepisorus longifolius was sister to all the remaining species of Lepisorus, which formed a clade.

References

Polypodiaceae
Monotypic fern genera